The Day Hell Broke Loose 3 is an album from the Swishahouse. The first single was "How Hustler's Do It", featuring Webbie. The album debuted at #72 on the Billboard charts and received positive reviews. There's a video for "How the Hustler's Do It".

Track listing
 "Intro" - DJ Michael "5000" Watts
 "Swervin" - Coota Bang, Archie Lee & Lil' Keke
 "On What We On" - Archie Lee, Lil' Keke & Juelz Santana
 "How Hustler's Do It" - Lil' Keke, Webbie & Yung Redd
 "Hood Luv Me" - Yung Redd
 "So Fly" - Archie Lee & Paul Wall
 "Call Me What U Want" - Paul Wall, E-Class, & Yung Redd (also on Get Money, Stay True)
 "Wish U Well" - Coota Bang, Archie Lee & Lil' Keke
 "Gangsta" - Coota Bang & Lil' Keke
 "They Still Don't Know" - Archie Lee, Lil' Keke & Paul Wall
 "Truth Be Told" - Lil' Keke
 "Still Shining" - Lil' Keke & Yung Redd
 "Words from a G..." - Lil' Keke
 "In These Streets" - Lil' Keke

References

External links
 
 Official Swisha House Website

2006 compilation albums
Hip hop compilation albums